Věstonice Reservoir is a reservoir on the Thaya River in the South Moravia. It is 1668 ha in area. The reservoir was built on the place of Mušov village. This is a Natural Reserve since 1994 together with the mouth of rivers Jihlava and Svratka.
The Děvín Mountain peak  is in prominence over the lake level .

References

Czech Republic Environmental Law Service - The Nove Mlyny reservoirs
Dam Nové Mlýny
Littoral 0+ fish assemblages in three reservoirs of the Nové Mlýny Dam (Czech Republic)

Nové Mlýny Reservoirs
Břeclav District